Domingo Romo (17 April 1917 – 18 May 1993) was a Chilean footballer. He played in two matches for the Chile national football team in 1946. He was also part of Chile's squad for the 1946 South American Championship.

References

External links
 

1917 births
1993 deaths
Chilean footballers
Chile international footballers
Place of birth missing
Association football forwards
Audax Italiano footballers
Santiago Morning footballers